Cosmic Banditos is a 1986 novel by Allan Weisbecker, originally published by Vintage Books and reprinted in 2001 by NAL Trade Paperbacks. It was Weisbecker's first book.

The back of the book reads, "Mr. Quark is a down-on-his-luck pot smuggler hiding out in the mountains of Colombia with his dog, High Pockets, and a small band of banditos led by the irascible José. Only months before, these three and their fearless associates were rolling in millions in cash and high-grade marijuana, eluding prosecution on "ridiculously false" drug and terrorism charges. But times have quickly grown lean, and to liven up their exile, José decides to mug a family of American tourists."

The book tells two stories at once with Mr. Quark narrating; one taking place in the present, high up in the mountains of Colombia and the other taking place in the past: Mr. Quark's adventurous account of pot-smuggling voyages on his ship, the Don Juan. On his website, Weisbecker says it is a book about "a search for The Meaning of Life". Booklist calls it, "OUTRAGEOUS... An absurd and highly entertaining comic romp."

References 
www.aweisbecker.com (Author's Official Website)

1986 novels
Novels set in Colombia